The FC Basel 1925–26 season was their thirty third season since the club's foundation on 15 November 1893. The club's new chairman was Carl Burkhardt. It was Burkhardt's second period as chairman. At the AGM he took over the presidency from Karl Ibach. FC Basel played their home games in the Landhof in the district Wettstein in Kleinbasel.

Overview 
Karl Bielser was team captain this season and as captain he led the team trainings and was responsible for the line-ups. Basel played a total of 33 matches in their 1925–26 season. 16 of these were in the domestic league, two were in the newly created Swiss Cup and 15 were friendly matches. Of these 15 friendlies four were played at home in the Landhof and 11 were away games, five in Switzerland and three each in France and Germany. Four of these games were won, four draws and seven defeats. 29 goals were scored, but 32 were conceded.

During these friendly games, a highlight was the fixture in the Landhof as Huddersfield Town visited. Huddersfield had just won the English Football League championship for the third consecutive season. The game attracted 3,500 supporters. Basel lost the match against the English champions by five goals to one.

As in the previous seasons, this's season the Serie A was divided into three regional groups, each group with nine teams. Basel were allocated to the Central group together with local clubs Concordia Basel, Nordstern Basel and Old Boys Basel. The other teams allocated to this group were Young Boys Bern, FC Bern, Aarau, Grenchen and the newly promoted Solothurn. The teams that won each of the three groups would continue to the finals and the last placed teams in the groups had to play a play-off against relegation.

Basel visited the group newcomers for the first match and promptly lost 1–2. Following this initial shock, the team played twelve games in succession undefeated. However, only six of these games were won and six were drawn and at this point, despite having defeated the league leaders Young Boys, they were trailing by five points. Basel lost their last two home games and thus ended the season in second position. During their league season Basel won seven of their matches, drawing six and were defeated three times. They were nine points adrift of Young Boys, who continued to the finals. Servette won the championship, Grasshopper Club were runners-up and YB were classified third. Grenchen ended the group stage at the bottom of the table and had to play the promotion/relegation play-off against Black Stars Basel, who had won the second tier championship. The teams each won one of the play-off matches and Grenchen won the deciding match to remain in the top tier.

In their 16 league matches the team scored 26 goals and conceded 14. Arnold Hürzeler, who had joined the team for this season, was the team's top league goal scorer with eight goals. He left the club after the season. Karl Bielser was second best league scorer with seven goals. Jules Düblin, Karl Putzendopler and Alfred Schlecht each scored two league goals.

The very first Swiss Cup tournament was organised this season by the Swiss Football Association (and has been organised by them annually since then). In the first round Basel were drawn against lower tier FC Horgen and the game took place on 4 October 1925. Basel won their first cup match 8–1 and Arnold Hürzeler proved his goal scoring qualities by securing the victory for his team by scoring six of the goals. In the next round, however, Basel were eliminated against Aarau, after a draw, by toss of a coin. Grasshopper Club won the final on 11 April 1926, played in the Letzigrund, 2–1 against FC Bern.

Players 
Squad members

Results 
Legend

Friendly matches

Pre- and mid-season

Winter break to end of season

Serie A

Central Group results

Central Group table

Swiss Cup 

Notes

See also 
 History of FC Basel
 List of FC Basel players
 List of FC Basel seasons

References

Sources 
 Rotblau: Jahrbuch Saison 2014/2015. Publisher: FC Basel Marketing AG. 
 Die ersten 125 Jahre. Publisher: Josef Zindel im Friedrich Reinhardt Verlag, Basel. 
 FCB team 1925–26 at fcb-archiv.ch
 Switzerland 1925-26 at RSSSF

External links
 FC Basel official site

FC Basel seasons
Basel